Women in Love is a British two-part television film, a combined adaptation by William Ivory of two D. H. Lawrence novels, The Rainbow (1915) and Women in Love (1920). Directed by Miranda Bowen and produced by Mark Pybus, it features Saskia Reeves, Rachael Stirling, Rosamund Pike, Rory Kinnear, Joseph Mawle and Ben Daniels. It was first transmitted on BBC Four on 24 and 31 March 2011. It was made by Company Pictures and filmed in South Africa. Other cast members included Ben Daniels as Will Brangwen. Music by Chris Letcher.

Cast
Rory Kinnear as Rupert Birkin
Rachael Stirling as  Ursula Brangwen
Joseph Mawle as  Gerald Crich
Olivia Grant as Hermione Roddice
Rosamund Pike as Gudrun Brangwen
Ben Daniels as Will Brangwen
Saskia Reeves as Anna Brangwen
Patrick Lyster as  Mr. Crich
James Alexander as  Alexander Roddice
Grant Swanby as Wolfgang Loerke

Reception
In her review for The Daily Telegraph, Ceri Radford praised the performances and singled out Kinnear as the best. In conclusion, she said: "If you love DH Lawrence’s books, you probably loved this rich and well-acted adaptation. However, you may have found yourself cringing behind a cushion in places if, like me, you felt that the most tumescent thing in Lady Chatterley’s Lover was the prose." Sam Wollaston in The Guardian said that the two novels had been "artfully sewn together" and that it was "quite true to Lawrence in spirit, I think", despite saying he "never got on well" with the author.

References

External links

2011 British television series debuts
2011 British television series endings
2010s British drama television series
BBC high definition shows
BBC television dramas
2010s British television miniseries
Films based on works by D. H. Lawrence
Television shows based on British novels
Television series by All3Media
English-language television shows
Television shows set in the United Kingdom
Television shows set in South Africa